The 2000 Connecticut Huskies men's soccer team represented the University of Connecticut during the 2000 NCAA Division I men's soccer season. The Huskies won their second NCAA title, and third overall when including NSCAA championships.  The Huskies were coached by Ray Reid, in his fourth season.  They played home games at Morrone Stadium.

Schedule

|-
!colspan=6 style="background:#002868; color:#FFFFFF;"| Regular season

|-
!colspan=6 style="background:#002868; color:#FFFFFF;"| Big East Tournament

|-
!colspan=6 style="background:#002868; color:#FFFFFF;"| NCAA Tournament

References

UConn Huskies men's soccer seasons
Connecticut
UConn Soccer, men's
NCAA Division I Men's Soccer Tournament-winning seasons
NCAA Division I Men's Soccer Tournament College Cup seasons
Connecticut